Lorenzo Tugnoli (born 1979) is an Italian photojournalist, based in Beirut. He won the 2019 Pulitzer Prize for Feature Photography.

Life and work

Tugnoli was born and raised in Lugo, Emilia-Romagna, Italy.

He worked as a photojournalist in the Middle East before moving to Kabul, Afghanistan in 2010, where he lived and worked before moving to Beiruit, Lebanon in 2015.

Publications
The Little Book of Kabul. 2014. Photographs by Tugnoli, text by  Francesca Recchia.

Awards
2019: Winner, Pulitzer Prize for Feature Photography for photo storytelling of the famine in Yemen published in The Washington Post
2019: Nominee, World Press Story of the Year, World Press Photo, Amsterdam
2019: Winner, General news, stories, World Press Photo, Amsterdam
2020: Winner, Contemporary Issues, Stories, World Press Photo

References

External links

Italian photographers
Italian photojournalists
Living people
1979 births